Jakub Szymański (born 25 March 1998) is a Polish volleyball player. At the professional club level, he plays for GKS Katowice.

Career

National team
Szymański took part at the 2015 European Youth Olympic Festival and on 1 August 2015 achieved a gold medal after the final match with Bulgaria (3–0). On 23 August 2015, Poland achieved its first title of the U19 World Champions. In the final his team beat hosts – Argentina (3–2).

Honours

Youth national team
 2015  European Youth Olympic Festival
 2015  FIVB U19 World Championship

References

External links
 
 Player profile at PlusLiga.pl 
 Player profile at Volleybox.net

1998 births
Living people
People from Aleksandrów County
Polish men's volleyball players
Effector Kielce players
GKS Katowice (volleyball) players
Outside hitters